The ARP 2500 is a monophonic analog modular synthesizer equipped with a set of sliding matrix switches above each module. These are the primary method of interconnecting modules. It is the first product of ARP Instruments, Inc., built from 1970 to 1981.

Features

There are rows of 1/8" miniphone jacks at the end of each row of matrix switches, to interconnect rows of switches. The main 2500 cabinet can hold 15 modules, and optional wing cabinets can each hold 8. The matrix switch interconnection scheme allow any module's output to connect to any other module's input.  This is unlike the patch cords of competitive units from Moog and Buchla which can obscure control knobs and associated markings, but it has the disadvantage of greater cross-talk.

Although the 2500 proved to be a reliable and user-friendly machine, it was not commercially successful, selling approximately 100 units. A collection of the 2500's most popular modules was packaged into a single, non-modular unit as the ARP 2600, leaving out the matrix switching and more esoteric functions.

Notable users and appearances
John Kongos first used one at Trident Studios in 1971, then in 1973 he acquired his own - it was used extensively at his Tapestry Studio, on his own recordings as well as Def Leppard (Pyromania), Mutt Lange, Alain Chamfort, Tony Visconti, Ryan Ulyate and many others.

The ARP 2500 was extensively used by British producer David Hentschel on recordings such as "Funeral for a Friend" from Elton John's 1973 album Goodbye Yellow Brick Road. Jeff Wayne's 1978 multi-platinum selling album War Of the Worlds features the ARP 2500, including the sound of Martian speech.

In the 1977 motion picture Close Encounters of the Third Kind, a 2500 unit is used to communicate with aliens. The ARP technician sent to install the unit, Phil Dodds, was cast as the musician. The unit featured in the film consisted of a fully loaded main unit, two fully loaded wing cabinets and dual keyboards in a custom case.

It has been used by artists such as Aphex Twin, David Bowie, Vince Clarke,  Faust, John Frusciante, Jean Michel Jarre, Cevin Key, Kraftwerk, Jimmy Page, Vangelis and The Who. The composer Éliane Radigue has worked almost exclusively with the 2500.

References

External links
Vintage Synth Explorer

ARP synthesizers
Analog synthesizers
Modular synthesizers
Monophonic synthesizers